Manuel Ernesto López Mondragón (born 22 February 1983) is a former Mexico-born football player whose professional career began with club Veracruz. He last played for Venados F.C. in the Ascenso MX.

Career
López Mondragón started his career with Veracruz. During his playing time there, he was considered as a starter due to his great defending abilities.

He played with Atlético Veracruz of the Liga de Balompié Mexicano during the league's inaugural season, leading them to a runners-up finish after losing to Chapulineros de Oaxaca in the finals.

References

External links

1983 births
Living people
Liga MX players
C.D. Veracruz footballers
Club Puebla players
Querétaro F.C. footballers
Footballers from Veracruz
Mexican footballers
People from Xalapa
Association football defenders
Liga de Balompié Mexicano players